Cormocephalus bungalbinensis is a species of centipede in the Scolopendridae family. It is endemic to Australia, and was first described in 1983 by Lucien E. Koch.

Distribution
The species is found in south-west Western Australia.

Behaviour
The centipedes are solitary terrestrial predators that inhabit plant litter, soil and rotting wood.

References

 

 
bungalbinensis
Centipedes of Australia
Fauna of Western Australia
Animals described in 1983
Endemic fauna of Australia